The 1983 NCAA Women's Gymnastics championship involved 10 schools competing for the national championship of women's NCAA Division I gymnastics.  It was the second NCAA gymnastics national championship and the defending NCAA Team Champion for 1982 was Utah.  The Competition took place in Salt Lake City, Utah hosted by the University of Utah in the Jon M. Huntsman Center.

Team Results

Top Ten Individual All-Around Results

Individual Event Finals Results

Vault

Uneven Bars

Balance Beam

Floor Exercise

References

External links
  Gym Results

NCAA Women's Gymnastics championship
NCAA Women's Gymnastics Championship